In Greek mythology, Alchanus was the son of the nymph Charidia and Zeus, king of the gods.

Note

References 

 Pseudo-Clement, Recognitions from Ante-Nicene Library Volume 8, translated by Smith, Rev. Thomas. T. & T. Clark, Edinburgh. 1867. Online version at theoi.com

Children of Zeus
Demigods in classical mythology